is a 2008 Japanese television series. It is based on the biography of Michihiro Takabatake, a professional baseball player and coach who became a high-school teacher at the age of 59.

Cast
Katsumi Takahashi as Michihiro Takabayashi
Ran Itō as Michiko Takabayashi
Shohei Kawaguchi as Kōhei Takabayashi
Katsuya Kobayashi as Kazuma Aragaki
Kōtarō Satomi as Seiichirō Tendō
Masato Hagiwara as Ikkyū Abe
Kazue Fukiishi as Aya Tokitō
Shinya Tsukamoto as Saburō Ōta

Awards
 Hoso Bunka Foundation Award (Episodes 1 and 4)

References

2008 Japanese television series debuts
2008 Japanese television series endings
Japanese drama television series
Television series based on actual events